Rijnsburgse Boys is a football club from Rijnsburg in the Netherlands.

The club was established on 24 March 1930. They currently play in the Tweede Divisie. The club won the Saturday Hoofdklasse A title in the 2005–06, 2006–07 and 2008–09 seasons.

Since being founded in 1930 till 1957, the club has played on several locations in Rijnsburg. Since 1957 the club moved to Sportpark Middelmors, where it's still playing their homegames. The unofficial nickname of Rijnsburgse Boys is 'uien' - Dutch for "onions" - originating from the late 1500s, when Rijnsburg was famous for its onion farms.

The club has always been one of the most successful clubs in the Dutch amateur football. After losing a decision match in the 2015/2016 season against GVVV (1–2), the club did not play first amateur-tier in a long time. In the 2016/2017 season, Rijnsburg defeated Westlandia and SV Spakenburg to promote to the Tweede Divisie, the highest tier for non-pro teams.

Rijnsburgse Boys' first year in the Tweede Divisie was quite a success. The squad, managed by Pieter Mulders finished 5th in the top flight of non-pro football.

Current squad

References

External links
 Official site of Rijnsburgse Boys 

Football clubs in the Netherlands
Football clubs in Katwijk
Association football clubs established in 1930
1930 establishments in the Netherlands